Libor Malina (born 14 June 1973 in Kladno) is a Czech discus thrower. His personal best throw is 67.13 metres, achieved in July 2001 in Jablonec.

He finished fifth at the 1992 World Junior Championships. He then competed at three World Championships (1997, 1999 and 2003) as well as the 2000 Summer Olympics before reaching an international final, as he finished tenth at the 2004 Summer Olympics.

Achievements

References

1973 births
Living people
Czech male discus throwers
Athletes (track and field) at the 2000 Summer Olympics
Athletes (track and field) at the 2004 Summer Olympics
Olympic athletes of the Czech Republic
Sportspeople from Kladno